Monticello High School is a rural public high school located in Monticello, Wisconsin in Green County, Wisconsin.

School history
The original school house was built in 1902, on the north end of town. In 1912 it was decided to build a new school closer to the center of the town. It was completed in 1913 and was built where the current one is. The first yearbook was printed in 1927 and the principal at the time was Mr. Corydon L. Rich. The first graduating class to wear caps and gowns was the class of 1932. The elementary wing was added in 1958, along with the now named Rehmstedt Gym. It is named after Mr. Rehmsted, who donated $32,000 to the school. In 1980 the original school building was demolished and replaced with the current high school office and rooms, the Rhemsted gym flooded that year right before the school year started and part of the gym was unusable. In 1996 a new gym which is called the Elmer Lemon Gym, computer labs, and music rooms were added.

Administration
 Mr. Mark Gustafson is Monticello's current principal.
Mr. Allen Brokopp is Monticello's current district administrator effective January 9, 2019

Past principals
 Mr. Allen Brokopp (2009-2013)
 Mrs. Susan McGuire (2009)
 Mr. Kenneth Colle (2001–2009)
 Mrs. Susan Halseth (1999–2000)
 Mr. Joel Espe (1993–1998)
 Mr. William Greiner (1989–1992)
 Mr. Haasl (1984–1988)
 Mr. Ben Campa (1982–1983)
 Mr. Brad Colton (1981-1981)
 Mr. John Kammerud (1977–1980)
 Mr. Leonard Cisewski (1974–1976)
 Mr. Barnes (1972–1973)
 Mr. Nelson (1971–1972)
 Mr. Larson (1969–1970)
 Mr. F. C. Rehmstedt (1961–1968)
 Mr. Herman Becker (1932–1960)
 Mr. Corydon L. Rich (1927)
 Mr. M. T. Rodda (1916)
 Mr. Dwight Flowers (1907)

Mascot

Monticello's mascot is the Pony. It is inspired by John Ponyicsanyi, a former basketball coach and high school Business Education teacher. He has since been elected into the Wisconsin Basketball Coach's Association Hall of Fame. John Ponyicsanyi son, Jack, played for his fathers basketball team. Jack says today, that there wasn't a mascot before the Ponies, but the Monticello Basketball team (with Coach Ponyicsanyi) was AMAZING! They then decided that we should be named the Ponies after Coach John Ponyicsanyi.

Notable alumni
Gene Lynn - real estate developer of facilities for the elderly; philanthropist; donated Monticello Public Library building
Elmer J. Lemon - accountant (partner in Grant Thornton 28 yrs); founder and longtime president of Monticello Foundation; inducted into the Wisconsin Interscholastic Athletic Association’s Hall of Fame as a “Friend of Basketball” in 2013, recognized as one of the top scorers in the state; donated funds to repair floor in Monticello School gym, now called the Elmer Lemon Gymnasium.
David Quade - Monroe Truck Equipment, Inc. President 
Woody Wilson - Basketball Coach, Wisconsin Basketball Coaches Association Hall of Fame
Jim Zweifel - Held the Wisconsin State record for most points scored in career for 17 years (2,303 points), Wisconsin Basketball Coaches Association Hall of Fame 
John Ponyicsanyi - Basketball coach; Wisconsin Basketball Coaches Association Hall of Fame; Pony Mascot inspired by him
Jimmy Voegeli - Musician 
Heidi Krumenauer - Writer 
Jill Wittenwyler - Olympic Pole Vaulter

Athletics and extracurricular activities
Monticello High School's athletics program offers  Varsity Football, Basketball, Volleyball, Baseball, Softball, Cross Country, Track and Field, Wrestling. Monticello High School also offers Band, Choir, FFA, FCCLA, and FBLA.

Monticello participates in the Six Rivers East Conference formerly the State Line League. The other members of the Six Rivers East Conference are Juda, Pecatonica, Black Hawk, Albany, Argyle, Barneveld. Monticello co-ops with the New Glarus School District in the sports of Cross Country, Football, and wrestling, which includes Belleville. For these co-op sports they compete in the Capital Conference South, which includes Marshall, Cambridge, Wisconsin Heights, Waterloo, Belleville, and New Glarus High Schools.

Boys Basketball
-Regional Championships'1950 1951 1957 1958 1965 2000, 2002, 2004, 2010
-Conference Championships1941 1946 1950 1951 1957 1958 1969, 1973, 1974, 1977, 1979, 1999, 2004, 2009, 2010, 2011

Girls Basketball
-State Championships- 1991
-Regional Championships- 1990, 1993, 2003, 2004, 2005, 2006

Football
-Conference Championships-1987, 1988, 1990, 1991, 1992, 2001, 2002, 2005

Boys Cross Country
-State Championships Qualification- 1994, 1995, 2000, 2009
-Sectional Championships- 1994, 1995, 1996
-Regional Championships- 1996
-Conference Championships- 1996, 1998, 2006, 2007, 2009, 2010, 2011, 2019 (joint team with New Glarus)

Girls Cross Country
-State Championships Qualification- 1991, 2000, 2009
-Sectional Championships- 1994, 1996, 1997, 1998, 2000
-Regional Championships- 2006
-Conference Championships- 1996, 1997, 1998, 2000, 2006, 2007, 2009, 2011

Girls Track and Field
-Regional Championship- 1977
-Conference Championships- 1978, 1979, 1990

Softball
-Regional Championship- 2008
-Conference Championships- 2005

Volleyball
-Regional Championships- 1977, 1989, 1990, 1993, 1995, 1996, 1998
-Conference Championships- 1973, 1976, 1978, 1979, 1980, 1989, 1990, 1994, 1995, 1996, 2011

Wrestling
-Regional Championships- 2006
-Conference Championships- 2005, 2006

References

Schools in Green County, Wisconsin
Public high schools in Wisconsin
Educational institutions established in 1902
1902 establishments in Wisconsin